The men's freestyle 74 kg is a competition featured at the 2016 Russian National Freestyle Wrestling Championships, and was held in Yakutsk, Russia on May 27.

Medalists

Results
Legend
F — Won by fall
WO — Won by walkover

Finals

Top half

Bottom half

Repechage

External links
http://wrestrus.ru/turnirs/215/table/74/1/
http://cs636318.vk.me/v636318357/a2c9/nCa5FHZUDbE.jpg
http://cs7003.vk.me/v7003761/1ff80/gt4mQ3EnsNE.jpg

Men's freestyle 74 kg